Aronsson is a Swedish and Icelandic surname, and means son of Aron. Notable people with the surname include:

Anders Aronsson (born 1885), Swedish politician
Ivar Aronsson (born 1928), Swedish rower who competed in the 1956 Summer Olympics
Jan Aronsson (1931–2016), Swedish footballer
Kerstin-Maria Aronsson (born 1937), Swedish politician
Lars Aronsson (born 1966), Swedish computer programmer and consultant, founder of Project Runeberg and the wiki susning
Mats Aronsson (born 1951), former Swedish football player
Ronja Aronsson (born 1997), Swedish footballer